Dunham-on-Trent is a village and civil parish in Nottinghamshire, England.

According to the 2001 census it had a population of 351, falling slightly to 343 at the 2011 Census.

The earliest part of the Grade I listed parish church of St Oswald is the tower, dating from the 15th century and Perpendicular in style.  The rest is mostly Victorian, built 1861–62 by T.C. Hine, father of George Thomas Hine, though the south nave wall remains from an earlier reconstruction completed in 1802.

Notable people
The pro-EU campaigner Anna Soubry grew up in Dunham-on-Trent and Clumber Park.

References

External links

Villages in Nottinghamshire
Civil parishes in Nottinghamshire
Bassetlaw District